Carroll Branch is a stream in the U.S. state of West Virginia.

Carroll Branch was named after the local Carroll family which fled an Indian attack in 1789.

See also
List of rivers of West Virginia

References

Rivers of Kanawha County, West Virginia
Rivers of West Virginia